Ural Rimovich Amirov (born 3 July 1980) is a former Russian professional football player.

Club career
He made his Russian Football National League debut for FC Gazovik-Gazprom Izhevsk on 21 April 1999 in a game against FC Sokol Saratov.

External links
 

1980 births
People from Neftekamsk
Living people
Russian footballers
Association football forwards
FC Rubin Kazan players
FC Fakel Voronezh players
FC Chernomorets Novorossiysk players
FC Volgar Astrakhan players
FC Gornyak Uchaly players
FC Bashinformsvyaz-Dynamo Ufa players
FC Izhevsk players
FC Sakhalin Yuzhno-Sakhalinsk players
FC Armavir players
FC Yenisey Krasnoyarsk players
FC Lukhovitsy players
Sportspeople from Bashkortostan